Brainscan is a 1994 American science fiction slasher film directed by John Flynn and written by Brian Owens and Andrew Kevin Walker. The film stars Edward Furlong, Frank Langella, Amy Hargreaves, Jamie Marsh, and T. Ryder Smith. The soundtrack was composed by George S. Clinton.

Plot
A lonely boy named Michael Brower lives an isolated existence in his absent father's mansion. Michael's mother was killed in a car accident, which also permanently injured his leg. From his bedroom window he spends his spare time watching his crush, a typical girl-next-door named Kimberly, who, unbeknownst to Michael, also feels the same way about him. A huge fan of horror films and video games, Michael's only friend is a similar-minded misfit named Kyle. They are members of a Horror Club at school, which the principal bans.  Kyle tells Michael about a new, ultra-realistic game called Brainscan. Intrigued, Michael mail-orders the first disc.

The game begins strangely, with a warning screen informing him that the experience has much in common with hypnotic suggestion. During his first experience with the game, Michael is encouraged to act as a psychopathic murderer by the game's host, an entity known as Trickster. In the game, Michael murders a stranger and takes his foot as a trophy. Later, he is horrified to discover that his victim in the game was a real person, and that the same murder also happened in the real world.

Kyle begs Michael to let him play the game, and Michael angrily rebuffs him. Later, Michael is tormented by Trickster, who materializes into reality and plays a Primus song in Michael's bedroom. Because there is a possible witness to the earlier murder, Trickster tells Michael he must play the second disc to kill the witness.  Michael refuses at first, but eventually gives in.  However, this time he has no memory of playing the game.  He finds Kyle's necklace, bloody in his freezer and realizes he murdered Kyle.

Michael doesn't remember the murder and calls Kyle. The phone is answered by Detective Hayden. Michael becomes paranoid that he will be sent to jail. He is also continually annoyed by Trickster, plaguing his home. Trickster ultimately instructs him to kill Kimberly.

At nightfall Michael sneaks into her room, but refuses to hurt her. Trickster reveals that he is actually an evil counterpart within Michael's mind. He possesses Michael, the struggle of which wakes Kimberly. Kimberly reveals she has been watching and photographing Michael, which allows him to break free from his own inner darkness. At the last minute, the Trickster materializes and opens the bedroom door. Detective Hayden enters and shoots Michael dead.

Michael awakens in his room. He discovers that the whole experience was a fantasy. After a short outburst of rage, ranting at the game for his traumatic experiences, he excitedly realizes that Kyle is still alive and that nothing in the game happened in the real world. His experience with the game's iteration of Kimberly gives him confidence, and he goes over to her house and asks her out, which she replies with a shy "maybe" and kisses him.

The next day, Michael brings the Brainscan disc to school to show the principal, who had demanded to preview all games and movies.  It is implied that the principal will have the same nightmarish experience as Michael because Trickster appears in the background.

Cast

Edward Furlong as Michael
Frank Langella as Detective Hayden
T. Ryder Smith as The Trickster
Amy Hargreaves as Kimberly
Jamie Marsh as Kyle
Victor Ertmanis as Martin
David Hemblen as Dr. Fromberg

Production
The script for Brainscan had initially been written in 1987 by Andrew Kevin Walker and originally was centered around a VHS tape, however after producer Michael Roy acquired the script he performed some uncredited re-writes turning the tape into an interactive CD-ROM video game in order to tap into the public fascination with virtual reality. The character of The Trickster was also a creation in the re-writes as the original script by Walker had no physical antagonist and was simply a voice who tormented Michael over the phone.

John Flynn later recalled:
The main interest for me was the Trickster character (a cadaverous Alice Cooper-like entity who materializes from a CD-ROM computer game - Ed.). The Trickster was the core of the movie and what attracted me to the script. We found this stage actor (T. Ryder Smith) to play the Trickster and he was extraordinary. Eddie Furlong was a 15-year-old kid who couldn't act. You had to "slap him awake" every morning. I don’t want to get into knocking people, but I was not a big Eddie Furlong fan.

Soundtrack
The soundtrack features hard rock, grunge, and heavy metal from then-emerging bands, including Alcohol Funnycar, Mudhoney, White Zombie, OLD, Dandelion, Primus, Tad, Pitchshifter, and the Butthole Surfers. It has the main title theme from George S. Clinton's score.

Reception
Critical reception was mostly negative. Rotten Tomatoes gave the film a "Rotten" rating of 13%, based on 16 reviews. Entertainment Weekly gave Brainscan a "D" rating, and stated "Despite the lurid premise, Brainscan offers zero in the way of sick thrills". Variety also gave a negative review stating, "It's a rare teen horror pic that can be faulted for excessive restraint, but Brainscan may be too tame for the creature-feature fans and slasher devotees who will be drawn by its ad campaign."

The film was released on Blu-ray by Mill Creek Entertainment on a special double feature of Brainscan and Mindwarp, reviewed by Jay Alan of the Horror News Network. He praised the acting and the soundtrack by Primus and White Zombie.

References

External links

1994 films
1994 horror films
1994 science fiction films
1990s science fiction horror films
1990s slasher films
1990s teen horror films
American science fiction horror films
American slasher films
American teen horror films
Films about computing
Films about telepresence
Films about video games
Films directed by John Flynn
Films scored by George S. Clinton
Films set in New Jersey
Films shot in Montreal
Films with screenplays by Andrew Kevin Walker
Techno-horror films
Triumph Films films
1990s English-language films
1990s American films